JSC Ulyanovsk Mechanical Plant or UMP for short (translit. Ulyanovsk Mekhanicheskiy Zavod, UMZ) is a Soviet/Russian military enterprise, now part of Almaz-Antey holding. Founded on January 1, 1966 by the Decree of Soviet government. Located in the city of Ulyanovsk, Russia next to UAZ.

Products

UMZ settled to mass production of:
 ZSU Shilka 1964-1982
 2K12 Kub (also an export version under the name Kvadrat) 1968-1985
 9K37 Buk since 1980
 9K22 Tunguska since 1981
 Pantsir complex radiotechnics system since 1988
 Orion, Ohota complex radiotechnics system since 2000
 a set of civilian products

References

External links

  Official site of UMZ

1966 establishments in the Soviet Union
Manufacturing companies of the Soviet Union
Defence companies of the Soviet Union
Science and technology in the Soviet Union
Almaz-Antey
Companies based in Ulyanovsk